General Wemyss may refer to:

Colville Wemyss (1891–1959), British Army general
David Douglas Wemyss (1760–1839), British Army major general
William Wemyss (1760–1822), British Army general